Paullin is a surname. Notable people with the surname include:

Charles O. Paullin (1869–1944), American naval historian
Louise Paullin (1848–1910), American stage actress
William Paullin (1812–1871), American balloonist

See also
Paulin (disambiguation)
Paulli